Blackguard Bay is a natural bay on the coast of Labrador in the province of Newfoundland and Labrador, Canada.  The closest inhabited place is Cartwright.

References

Bays of Newfoundland and Labrador